Barubria is a genus of lichenized fungi in the family Pilocarpaceae.

References

Pilocarpaceae
Lichen genera
Lecanorales genera
Taxa named by Antonín Vězda
Taxa described in 1986